The Royal London Hospital is a large teaching hospital in Whitechapel in the London Borough of Tower Hamlets. It is part of Barts Health NHS Trust. It provides district general hospital services for the City of London and Tower Hamlets and specialist tertiary care services for patients from across London and elsewhere. The current hospital building has 845 beds and 34 wards. It opened in February 2012.

The hospital was founded in September 1740 and was originally named the London Infirmary. The name changed to the London Hospital in 1748, and in 1990 to the Royal London Hospital. The first patients were treated at a house in Featherstone Street, Moorfields. In May 1741, the hospital moved to Prescot Street, and remained there until 1757 when it moved to its current location on the south side of Whitechapel Road, Whitechapel, in the London Borough of Tower Hamlets.

The hospital's roof-top helipad is the London's Air Ambulance operating base. The helicopter is stored overnight at RAF Northolt.

History

Origins
By the middle of the 18th century there were five voluntary hospitals in London (St Bartholomew's, Guy's, St Thomas', Westminster and St George's) which provided free medical care to those who could not afford it. However, none was located to the east of the City, where it could have served the comparatively impoverished and rapidly growing population of Spitalfields and Whitechapel; this was the void that The London Hospital was to fill. The institution that was to become The Royal London Hospital was founded on 23 September 1740, when seven gentlemen met in the Feathers Tavern in Cheapside in the City of London to subscribe to the formation of an "intended new infirmary".

On 3 November, The London Infirmary opened in a house on Featherstone Street, Moorfields. The staff consisted of one surgeon, physician and apothecary; and was operated as a voluntary hospital, in which patients were not charged for treatment and their care was funded charitably from annual subscription fees.

In May 1741, the hospital moved to larger premises in Prescot Street, at that time in an exceedingly bad district. The following year, 2nd Duke of Richmond was persuaded by the hospital's surgeon, John Harrison, to become the first President of the new hospital. The name changed to The London Hospital around 1748. The houses at Prescot Street were in an unfit state for use by 1744. A subscription fund for a new building was opened, and the current site was acquired at Whitechapel Mount (then relatively sparsely built on); however, funds were acquired slowly and it was not until 1751 that work began on the new building. The purpose-built hospital, which was designed by Boulton Mainwaring and accommodated 300 beds was opened to staff and patients in September 1757. The next year, the trustees of the charity acquired a royal charter so that they could constitute themselves as a legal entity.

Medical students had been recorded as studying under the staff of The London Hospital as private pupils since the year it had begun, however it was not until 1785 that The London Hospital Medical College was founded; chiefly through the efforts of William Blizard, the hospital's surgeon. Private medical schools had been long established, but The London College was the first medical school in England and Wales organised in connection with a hospital. It amalgamated in 1995 with St Bartholomew's Hospital Medical College, under the aegis of Queen Mary and Westfield College to become St Bartholomew's and The Royal London School of Medicine and Dentistry.

Nineteenth Century 
In the 1870s the medical staff determined to improve the quality of nursing care and in 1880 Eva Luckes was employed as Matron of the Hospital, a post which she held for  nearly forty years. She was an influential nursing leader and instigated a new programme of nurse training, including the first Preliminary Training School for Nurses. She became known by her friend and mentor Florence Nightingale (also a Governor of The London Hospital) as 'O Matron of Matrons'. Luckes produced over 470 matrons during her tenure including Military Matrons in Chief Ethel Becher, Maud McCarthy and Sarah Oram, and several matrons of large provincial voluntary hospitals  and Poor Law infirmaries including Annie Sophia Jane McIntosh, Matron of St Bartholomew's Hospital. Edith Cavell also trained under Luckes. In the late 1890s, Edith Cavell, who later helped some 200 Allied soldiers escape from German-occupied Belgium during the First World War, trained and worked as a nurse at the hospital.

Joseph Merrick, known as the "Elephant Man", was admitted to the hospital in 1886 and spent the last few years of life there. His mounted skeleton is currently housed at the medical school, but is not on public display.

Twentieth Century 
In the early part of the twentieth century the hospital sent out 160 nurses to work unsupervised in private houses. This earned £4,000 a year, a profit of £1,700.

In 1990 the Queen visited the hospital and added "Royal" to the name, to celebrate the 250th anniversary of its founding. The present School of Nursing and Midwifery was formed in 1994 by the merger of the schools from St Bartholomew's Hospital and The Royal London Hospital to become the St Bartholomew School of Nursing & Midwifery. Prior to this, the school of nursing was known as the Princess Alexandra College of Nursing and Midwifery. In 1995 the new Nursing School was incorporated into City University, London.

The new hospital 
In March 2005 planning permission was granted for the redevelopment and expansion of The Royal London Hospital. The scheme was procured under a Private Finance Initiative contract in 2006. Sited on the grounds of the existing hospital, the works involved the replacement of certain of the hospital's old facilities, some of which date back to when the hospital moved to its existing site in 1757. The works also involved the creation of a new trauma and emergency care centre and substantial new renal and paediatric facilities. These works, which were designed by HOK and undertaken by Skanska at a cost of £650 million, opened in part in 2012 and were completed in 2016. The old hospital buildings are being converted into the new Tower Hamlets Town Hall for Tower Hamlets Council.

In March 2020 it was reported that the 14th and 15th floors of the hospital, which were never fitted-out because the trust had been unable to afford to do so, would be opened in order to provide more capacity to deal with patients during the COVID-19 pandemic. These floors were opened in May 2020 at a cost of £24 million.

Museum and archives

The Royal London has a museum which is located in the crypt of a 19th-century church. It reopened in 2002 after extensive refurbishment and is open to the public free of charge. The museum covers the history of the hospital since its foundation in 1740 and the wider history of medicine in the East End. It is a member of the London Museums of Health & Medicine.  It includes works of art, surgical instruments, medical and nursing equipment, uniforms, medals, documents and books. There is a forensic medicine section which includes original material on Jack the Ripper, Dr Crippen and the Christie murders. There are also displays on Joseph Merrick (the 'Elephant Man') and former Hospital nurse Edith Cavell. There is the model of a church in the hospital that was built by Joseph Merrick who spent the last few years of his life at the hospital.

The Royal London's archives contain documents dating back to 1740, including complete patient records since 1883. The collections are searchable on the Barts Health NHS Trust online catalogue, which contains information on over 50,000 entries and covering an 800-year span.

Emergency Department and Major Trauma Centre
The Royal London Hospital is the busiest trauma centre in the UK, with Barts and the London NHS Trust as a whole treating over 1,255 injury patients daily across its five hospitals.

The Queen Mary University of London Centre for Trauma Sciences, part of Barts and The London School of Medicine and Dentistry, has a strong clinical partnership with the hospital's Major Trauma Centre.

The Royal London Hospital is part of a citywide initiative to transform London's emergency and trauma services. In 2010, the London Trauma System was implemented. The network is believed to be the largest of its kind in the world. The System comprises four existing London hospitals, The Royal London Hospital (Whitechapel), King's College Hospital (Denmark Hill), St George's Hospital (Tooting) and St Mary's Hospital (Paddington), supported by a number of trauma units located in various A&E departments where patients with less serious injuries receive treatment.

In popular culture
The TV series Casualty 1900s is set at The Royal London, and follows the everyday life of the hospital throughout these years. Some of the storylines are based on actual cases drawn from the hospital records. Amazon Prime has acquired the series for broadcast in the US, where it is called London Hospital.

The TV comedy drama series Crashing (2016), which follows the lives of six property guardians living in a disused London hospital, was filmed at The Royal London.

The TV series Call the Midwife, which takes place during the 1950's and 1960's in East London, includes scenes at the then London Hospital. The series is a dramatization of the life of a nurse midwife who was trained at the hospital.

Patient entertainment 
In 2022 Bedrock Radio (established circa 2002), provide a community health radio service covering East London, South Essex and immediate surrounding areas. Bedrock Radio is a registered charity.

Arms

See also 
 Healthcare in London
 List of hospitals in England
 London's Air Ambulance 
 Whitechapel Mount

References

Sources

Further reading

External links 

 
 Royal London Hospital on the NHS website
 Inspection reports from the Care Quality Commission

Barts Health NHS Trust
NHS hospitals in London
Health in the London Borough of Tower Hamlets
Education in the London Borough of Tower Hamlets
Buildings and structures in the London Borough of Tower Hamlets
Hospitals established in the 1740s
1740 establishments in England
Medical museums in London
Museums in the London Borough of Tower Hamlets
Teaching hospitals in London
Buildings and structures in Whitechapel
Voluntary hospitals
Whitechapel